Mirko Pätzold (born 9 April 1976 in Potsdam) is a German bobsledder who has competed since 1998. He a silver medal in the two-man event at the 2008 FIBT World Championships in Altenberg, Germany.

References
Bobsleigh two-man world championship medalists since 1931
FIBT profile

1976 births
Living people
German male bobsledders
Sportspeople from Potsdam